Juracy Montenegro Magalhães GCC • GCIH (4 August 1905 – 15 May 2001) was a Brazilian military officer and politician. During his career, Magalhães was the state governor of Bahia twice: between 1931—1937 (federal interventor appointed by Getúlio Vargas) and 1959—1963 (elected); senator for Bahia (1955–1959), Minister of Justice (1965–66) and Minister of External Relations (1966–67) under president Humberto de Alencar Castello Branco, and Brazilian Ambassador to the United States. He was also the chairman of state oil company Petrobras (1954) and chairman of then state-run mining company Vale do Rio Doce.

Biography
He was the son of Joaquim Magalhães and Júlia Montenegro Magalhães. Having completed high school at the Lyceum of Ceará, he entered the military career. In 1927 he became an aspirant. A member of the tenentist movement, at the age of 25 he stood out during the so-called Revolution of 1930, leading a military column that traveled the northeast along the coast, entering the territories of Alagoas, Pernambuco, Sergipe and Bahia. 

His military career was successful. In 1933 he reached the rank of Captain; in 1940, that of Major; Lieutenant Colonel in 1945; Colonel in 1950 and General in 1957.

Despite being born in Ceará, it was in Bahia that he found his definitive address. He won a house of friends, in the capital of Bahia, at Monte Serrat – the same one where his son, Juracy Magalhães Júnior, committed suicide. Her other son Jutahy Magalhães was also a politician and her grandson Jutahy Magalhães Júnior is a federal deputy.

His political trajectory was greatly benefited by his proximity to the military. He held the following positions: senator of the Republic, federal deputy, military attaché and ambassador of Brazil to the United States, Minister of Justice and Foreign Affairs. He was also the first President of Petrobras and chaired the Vale do Rio Doce Company.

Government of Bahia 
Magalhães occupied the government of the State of Bahia for three terms (the first, initiated as an intervener, was later endorsed by the Legislative Assembly – here considered as a single term, since there was no continuity solution).

Intervention 

Juracy Magalhães was a lieutenant in the Army when he took over the government, appointed interventor by Getúlio Vargas – a position that promoted him as one of the articulators of the coup that ended, in Brazil, the Old Republic. He took over on 19 September 1931, and remained there until 25 April 1935, when he resumed – this time through an indirect election, by the Legislative Assembly – remaining in office until 10 November 1937.

The task was not, at first, easy: the position was claimed by the old politician JJ Seabra, who had supported Getúlio and had already been governor. Juracy was then a young lieutenant, only 25, almost 26 years old. His condition as an "outsider" only aggravated the reaction of the old chiefs of local politics, who aroused great opposition to him. But since then he has shown great ability to overcome these challenges, leaving them even more strengthened. Juracy also led a secret life: he had been an FBI informant during the last Vargas administration and confided to Adolf Berle that he had conspired against him in 1945. A noteworthy fact was that, during his tenure, the first arrest of the future leftist leader, Carlos Marighella, occurred, for having written a poem that criticized the interventor.

Among his accomplishments, he started the construction works of the Rui Barbosa Forum – interrupted by the interventionist Landulfo Alves, who followed him, and finally resumed and concluded by Otávio Mangabeira .

In the place where the home of the tribune Cezar Zama had been, in Praça de Piedade, he built the headquarters of the Public Security Secretariat – the centralizing body of repression, in the totalitarian regime that lived in the country at that time.

Inaugurated the Bahia Cocoa Institute in 1936, a ceremony attended by Getúlio Vargas himself.

In 1935/1936, the government of Juracy Magalhães interrupted the activities of the Integralist Brazilian Action – AIB (1932–1937), a movement idealized by the politician, poet and journalist Plínio Salgado, in the State of Bahia, with numerous conflicts with the police forces over the Integralists in an attempt to continue promoting their activities, with numerous arrests and deaths occurring [ 5 ], later on, justice guarantees the right of Integralists to continue their activities in the region.

On 10 November 1937, President Getúlio Vargas established the Estado Novo, a unitary dictatorial regime . Despite being loyal to the government, Juracy was opposed to that action by the president, which was in fact characterized as a coup . On the same day, he made a statement on Rádio Sociedade da Bahia and, on the 11th, he transmitted the position to the military commander in the State, leaving the Government Palace.

References 

1905 births
2001 deaths
People from Fortaleza
National Democratic Union (Brazil) politicians
Ambassadors of Brazil to the United States